Jan Verroken (30 January 1917 – 24 July 2020) was a Belgian politician.

Biography
Born on 30 January 1917, Verroken served as burgomaster of Oudenaarde, President of the Christelijke Volkspartij in the Belgian Parliament, and a Deputy for the Oudenaarde constituency. He was also a member of the European Parliament and served on the Benelux Parliament.

Verroken was detested in Wallonia, the francophone part of Belgium. During the Split of the Catholic University of Leuven Flemish students chanted "Walen buiten" (Walloons out), a slogan coined by Verroken. The university was split into the KU Leuven and the Université catholique de Louvain. In a 2016 interview with Pierre Havaux, Verroken minimized his role in these events, as well as downplaying the separatist tendency of Flemish demands, saying that there was "never in Flanders a project of form a separatist government, as was the case in Wallonia during the Royal Question".

References

1917 births
2020 deaths
People from Oudenaarde
Christian Democratic and Flemish politicians
Belgian centenarians
Men centenarians
Members of the Chamber of Representatives (Belgium)
Members of the Flemish Parliament
MEPs for Belgium 1979–1984
Mayors of places in Belgium
20th-century Belgian politicians